Dinka Džubur is an Australian actress, model and filmmaker. She is known for her work in the Golden Globe winning HBO television series True Blood, and films Battle of the Sexes and Turkey Shoot.

Early life and education
Born in Slavonski Brod, Croatia (then Yugoslavia), the daughter of Bosniak father Ramiz, an innovator in the technical engineering field and Croatian mother Katarina, a businesswoman. Dinka was a professional gymnast growing up.  After the outbreak of the Yugoslav Wars during Dinka's childhood, Dinka moved frequently, with stints living in different parts of Croatia and Germany. She changed 10 schools before finally settling in Australia. Dinka referred to this period stating that her "sports mindset helped her overcome the difficulties of a fast-changing reality and a childhood affected by war". She attended Keebra Park State High School on the Gold Coast in Queensland. Dinka obtained a scholarship to study Journalism at the University of Queensland before being accepted into Queensland University of Technology Acting Department in Brisbane where she graduated with a Fine Arts in Acting degree. Dinka is bilingual and speaks fluent Croatian, German and has an ear for accents.

Career

Modeling
Aged 16, Dinka was noticed by fashion scouts and first signed with Elite Model Management in Australia. She received considerable commercial exposure after a series of Australian print and TV ads for brands such as Billabong, The Corner Shop, She Swimwear amongst others. This increased her profile in the Australian market, after which Džubur relocated to Los Angeles.

In Los Angeles, Džubur had a multitude of runway appearances and was booked for various TV and print campaigns for major labels, including Tom Ford, Lancome, Project Runway's Kini Zamora and Gordana Gehlhausen.

In 2015, Dinka participated in Los Angeles and Style Fashion Weeks.

Dinka appeared in music videos by recording artists such as Bob Dylan, David Guetta and Nelly Furtado.

Džubur was also booked for print in magazines such as Elle, Vogue, Grazia and graced the Australian cover of Ocean Road Magazine in the summer 2018 edition with the cover-story "Australian Modern-Day Heroine".

Acting
Dinka started off her TV career on HBO's True Blood, followed by Australian drama series Secrets and Lies and Croatian telenovela for MediaPro Pictures Larin izbor.  For her 2014 role as Olga Reshenko in Turkey Shoot, Dinka performed all her stunts and fight sequences.  Dinka appeared as a sports reporter in the 2017 film Battle of the Sexes.  Dinka co-wrote, starred and executively produced the short film Little Hands, directed by Claire McCarthy. Dinka won the International Award for Best Actress in a leading role for her portrayal of Mia in Little Hands.

Public image
Dinka has been cited in Top 10 "Most Beautiful Actresses".
Media portals addressed Dinka as an "Iconic Beauty" oozing a "magnetic screen presence" and described her sex appeal as "explosive" and "aristocratic".

Humanitarian work

Dinka returned to the Balkans witnessing the aftermath of war during filming and development of Little Hands (2011). Upon her arrival to Bosnia & Herzegovina, she contacted the Ljubica Ivezić (Sarajevo) and Egipatsko Selo (Mostar) orphanages to learn more about the post-war effect on women and children. She spent three months on field in Mostar city, Bosnia & Herzegovina; Dinka later expressed she was overwhelmed by the sheer "energy, talent, unbreakable spirit and courage" of the youth in Mostar whilst residing in Bosnia & Herzegovina. To that end, her 2011 field visits were chronicled in the screenplay "Little Hands" in conjunction with the release of the humanitarian drama.

Three years later, in 2014,  Dinka returned to the Croatian region on a field mission, meeting with displaced people due to severe flooding. In conjunction with the organisation Cinema Croatia, Dinka met with the victims of floods donating funds to families in response to an emergency appeal.

Filmography

Actor

Theatre

Screenwriter
 2011: Little Hands (Short film)
 2009: Warning (Short film)

Producer
 2016: Blind Date (Short Film)
2011: Little Hands (Short film)
2009: Warning (Short Film)

Awards and nominations

References

External links

Living people
People from Slavonski Brod
Australian film actresses
Croatian film actresses
Croatian emigrants to Australia
Australian television actresses
University of Queensland alumni
Australian female models
Croatian female models
Australian emigrants to the United States
Australian people of Croatian descent
Australian people of Bosnia and Herzegovina descent
Year of birth missing (living people)
Croatian people of Bosniak descent